The 22117 / 18 Pune–Amravati AC Superfast Express is a Superfast Express train of the AC Express series belonging to Indian Railways – Central Railway zone that runs between  and  in India.

It operates as train number 22117 from Pune Junction to Amravati and as train number 22118 in the reverse direction, serving the states of Maharashtra.

Coaches

The 22117 / 18 Pune Junction–Amravati AC Superfast Express has 9 AC 3 tier, 4 AC 2 Tier & 2 End on Generator coaches. It doesn't carry a pantry car .

As is customary with most train services in India, coach composition may be amended at the discretion of Indian Railways depending on demand.

 EOG consists of Luggage and Generator coach
 B consists of AC 3 Tier coach
 PC consists of Pantry car coach
 A consists of AC 2 Tier coach
 H consists of First Class AC coach

Service

As the average speed of the train is above , as per Indian Railways rules, its fare includes a Superfast surcharge.

Routeing

Traction

As the route is fully electrified, an Ajni-based WAP-7 locomotive powers the train to its destination.

Rake sharing

22123/24 – Pune–Ajni AC Superfast Express

Operation

22117 Pune Junction–Amravati AC Superfast Express leaves Pune Junction every Wednesday & arriving Amravati the next day.
22118 Amravati–Pune Junction AC Superfast Express leaves Amravati every Thursday & arriving Pune Junction the next day.

References

External links
22117 AC Superfast Express at India Rail Info
22118 AC Superfast Express at India Rail Info

AC Express (Indian Railways) trains
Rail transport in Maharashtra
Transport in Amravati
Transport in Pune
Railway services introduced in 2017